Kit and The Widow were a British double act, performing humorous songs in the vein of Tom Lehrer or Flanders and Swann; they also cite Anna Russell as an influence.

Kit Hesketh-Harvey (singer) and Richard Sisson (The Widow, pianist) performed at the Edinburgh Fringe and in West End theatres, and accepted private bookings. They have issued a double CD album, Les Enfants du Parody, and 100 Not Out. They were both members of the Cambridge University Footlights society.

Their style combines musical classicism and an understated Cambridge urbanity with often outrageous satirical content. Targets of their humour range from stereotypes, such as the English white van driver ("White Van Man") and new-agers ("Dog on a String"), to the more specific, such as the Transportation Security Administration ("Bring It On") and even particular individuals such as Andrew Lloyd Webber ("Somebody Else"). Their poignant song "Swansong" sets a poem about the damage to the environment caused by rubbish, over a version of The Swan from The Carnival of the Animals by Saint-Saëns.

They performed several items at the BBC Comedy Prom 2011 hosted by Tim Minchin. In 2012, they announced on their official website that after thirty years they had ended their partnership.

References

External links
 Kit And The Widow

British comedy musical groups
English comedy duos
Musical groups from Cambridge